The 2017–18 season was the 50th season of competitive association football in Australia.

Domestic leagues

A-League

Regular season

Finals series

National Premier Leagues

The finals series featured the winner of each Member Federation's league competition in the National Premier Leagues, with the overall winner qualifying directly for the 2018 FFA Cup Round of 32.

W-League

Regular season

Domestic cups

FFA Cup

International club competitions

AFC Champions League

Group stage

Group F

Group H

National teams

Men's senior

Friendlies
The following is a list of friendlies played by the men's senior national team in 2017–18.

FIFA World Cup qualification

FIFA World Cup

Australia qualified for the 2018 FIFA World Cup, their fourth successive FIFA World Cup after defeating Honduras in a two-legged playoff in November 2017. They were the thirty-first team to qualify. The draw took place in Moscow on 1 December 2017, with Australia drawn in Group C alongside France, Peru, and Denmark.

Men's under-23

Friendlies
The following is a list of friendlies played by the Men's under 23 national team in 2017–18.

AFC U-23 Championship qualification

AFC U-23 Championship

Men's under-20

Friendlies
The following is a list of friendlies played by the men's under 20 national team in 2017–18.

AFC U-19 Championship qualification

Men's under-17

AFF U-15 Championship

AFC U-16 Championship qualification

Women's senior

Friendlies
The following is a list of friendlies played by the women's senior national team in 2017–18.

Tournament of Nations

Algarve Cup

AFC Women's Asian Cup

Women's under-20

Friendlies
The following is a list of friendlies played by the women's under 20 national team in 2017–18.

2017 AFC U-19 Women's Championship

Women's under-17

2017 AFC U-16 Women's Championship

Deaths
 2 July 2017: Billy Cook, 77, Australia and Slavia defender.
 31 July 2017: Les Murray, 71, commentator and journalist.
 31 August 2017: Mike Cockerill, 56, commentator and journalist.
 11 October 2017: Pat Hughes, 78, Australia and APIA midfielder.
 17 November 2017: Commins Menapi, 40, Solomon Islands and Sydney United forward.
 9 February 2018: Liam Miller, 36, Republic of Ireland, Perth Glory, Brisbane Roar and Melbourne City midfielder.
 7 June 2018: Cliff van Blerk, 79, Australia and APIA midfielder.

Retirements
 24 July 2017: Thomas Sørensen, former Denmark and Melbourne City goalkeeper.
 11 August 2017: Maddy Evans, former Brisbane Roar midfielder.
 11 February 2018: Shane Smeltz, former New Zealand, Brisbane Strikers, Adelaide City, Adelaide United, Wellington Phoenix, Gold Coast United, Perth Glory and Sydney FC striker.
 16 February 2018: Ashleigh Sykes, former Australia and Canberra United striker.
 14 April 2018: Josh Rose, former Brisbane Strikers, New Zealand Knights, Central Coast Mariners and Melbourne City defender.
 20 April 2018: Fahid Ben Khalfallah, former Tunisia, Melbourne Victory and Brisbane Roar winger.
 8 May 2018: Stephanie Ochs, former Canberra United defender.
 4 June 2018: Robbie Cornthwaite, former Australia, Adelaide United and Western Sydney Wanderers defender.

References

External links
 Football Federation Australia official website

 
 
Seasons in Australian soccer
2017–18 in Australian women's soccer